The Thompsoniidae are a family of parasitic barnacles belonging to the bizarre and highly apomorphic superorder Rhizocephala, and therein to the more diverse of the two orders, the Akentrogonida.

The Thompsoniidae are one of the smallish families of Rhizocephala, as typical for the Akentrogonida. They only contain four genera, of which two are not universally accepted:
 Diplothylacus Høeg & Lützen, 1993 (disputed)
 Pottsia Høeg & Lützen, 1993 (disputed)
 Thompsonia Häfele, 1911
 Thylacoplectus Coutière, 1902

References

External links

Barnacles
Parasitic crustaceans
Crustacean families